The Sacred Mushroom and the Cross: A Study of the Nature and Origins of Christianity Within the Fertility Cults of the Ancient Near East is a 1970 book about the linguistics of early Christianity and fertility cults in the Ancient Near East. It was written by John Marco Allegro (1923–1988).

Theories 
The book relates the development of language to the development of myths, religions, and cultic practices in world cultures. Allegro argues, through etymology, that the roots of Christianity, and many other religions, lay in fertility cults, and that cult practices, such as ingesting visionary plants to perceive the mind of God, persisted into the early Christian era, and to some unspecified extent into the 13th century with reoccurrences in the 18th century and mid-20th century, as he interprets the fresco of the Plaincourault Chapel to be an accurate depiction of eucharistic ritual ingestion of Amanita muscaria. Allegro argued that Jesus never existed as a historical figure but was rather a mythological creation of early Christians under the influence of psychoactive mushroom extracts such as psilocybin.

His unconventional claims have been subject to ridicule and scorn. As Time magazine put it in an article headed "Jesus as mushroom":

Reaction 
The book has been described as "notorious" and as "one of the strangest books ever published on the subject of religion and pharmacology". There was a media frenzy when it was published in 1970. This caused the publisher to apologize for issuing it and forced Allegro's resignation from his university position. Judith Anne Brown suggested that the book was "difficult to read and difficult to summarize, because he follows clues that criss-cross different cultures and lead into many-layered webs of association". Mark Hall writes that Allegro suggested the scrolls all but proved that a historical Jesus never existed. Philip Jenkins writes that Allegro was an eccentric scholar who relied on texts that did not exist in quite the form he was citing them, and calls the Sacred Mushroom and the Cross "possibly the single most ludicrous book on Jesus scholarship by a qualified academic".

Reconsideration 
Some studies of Allegro's work have given new purported evidence and led to calls for his theories to be re-evaluated by the mainstream. In November 2009 The Sacred Mushroom and the Cross was reprinted in a 40th anniversary edition with a 30-page addendum by Prof. Carl A. P. Ruck of Boston University. A more articulate exposition of Allegro's insights into early Christianity and his discoveries studying the Dead Sea Scrolls was published in his 1979 book The Dead Sea Scrolls and the Christian Myth.

The work of Allegro also gained recognition and consideration by such late proponents of experiential psychedelia through pharmacological interaction as Terence McKenna, who cited Allegro's claims of certain psychoactive fungi analogizing the Eucharist, spoken in a live lecture in the 1990s.

See also 
 Healers of the Dead Sea
 Historicity of Jesus
 James the Brother of Jesus
 The Passover Plot

References

Further reading 
 John C. King, A Christian View of The Mushroom Myth (Hodder & Stoughton, 1970)

External links 
 Conjuring Eden: Art and the Entheogenic Vision of Paradise, Entheos: Vol. 1 Issue 1, Summer 2001. By Carl A. P. Ruck, Blaise D. Staples, Mark Hoffman – images on entheomedia.org
  The Sacred Mushroom and the Cross at Goodreads.com

1970 non-fiction books
1970 in religion
American non-fiction books
Linguistics books
Books about ancient Christianity
Sociology of religion
Mycological literature
Hodder & Stoughton books
Psychedelic literature
Books about Jesus
Works about the Christ myth theory